Priperia is a monotypic genus of Polynesian sheet weavers containing the single species, Priperia bicolor. It was first described by Eugène Louis Simon in 1904, and has only been found in Hawaii.

See also
 List of Linyphiidae species (I–P)

References

Linyphiidae
Monotypic Araneomorphae genera
Spiders of Oceania